The  is a cabinet-level ministry in the Government of Japan. Its English name was Ministry of Public Management, Home Affairs, Posts and Telecommunications (MPHPT) prior to 2004. It is housed in the 2nd Building of the Central Common Government Office at 2-1-2 Kasumigaseki in Chiyoda, Tokyo, Japan.

The Ministry oversees the Japanese administrative system, manages local governments, elections, telecommunication, post, and governmental statistics.

The  is appointed from among the members of the cabinet.

History
Certain functions of the Management and Coordination Agency were transferred to the Cabinet Office in this process, while many functions of the MPT were transferred to an independent Postal Services Agency which later became Japan Post.

Subdivisions
The Ministry has the following subdivisions as of July 2011:

Bureaus
Minister's Secretariat (大臣官房)
Director-General of Minister's Secretariat
Director-General for Policy Coordination (3)
Director-General for Regional Vitalization
Director-General for Policy Evaluation
Deputy Director-General of Minister's Secretariat (14)
Counselor (12)
Secretarial Division
General Affairs Division
Accounts Division
Policy Planning Division
Policy Evaluation and Public Relations Division
Management Office
Personnel and Pension Bureau (人事恩給局)
Director-General of the Personnel and Pension Bureau
Deputy Director-General of Personnel and Pension Bureau
General Affairs Division
Personnel Policy Division
Aged Personnel Policy Division
Pension Planning Division
Pension Examination Division
Pension Execution Division
Counselor (5)
Administrative Management Bureau (行政管理局)
Director-General of the Administrative Management Bureau
Planning and Coordination Division
Government Information Systems Planning Division
Director for Management (8)
Administrative Evaluation Bureau (行政評価局)
Director-General of the Administrative Evaluation Bureau
General Affairs Division
Administrative Counseling Division
Director for Policy Evaluation
Director for Evaluation and Inspection (9)
Local Administration Bureau (自治行政局)
Director-General of the Local Administration Bureau
Local Administration Division
Administration Improvement Division
Municipal Merger Promotion Division
Regional Policy Division
Regional Self-support Promotion Division
Local Public Service Personnel Department
Director-General of the Local Public Service Personnel Department
Local Public Service Personnel Division
Welfare Division
Election Department
Director-General of the Election Department
Election Division
Election Management Division
Political Funds Regulation Division
Local Public Finance Bureau (自治財政局)
Director-General of the Local Public Finance Bureau
Local Public Finance Division
Local Public Finance Coordination Division
Local Allocation Tax Division
Local Bond Division
Local Public Enterprise Division
Financial Management Division
Local Tax Bureau (自治税務局)
Director-General of the Local Tax Bureau
Local Tax Planning Division
Prefectural Tax Policy Division
Municipal Tax Planning Division
Fixed Property Tax Division
Global ICT Strategy Bureau (国際戦略局)
Director-General of the Global ICT Strategy Bureau
Director-General for International Affairs, Global ICT Strategy Bureau
ICT Strategy Policy Division
Technology Policy Division
Standardization Division
Space Communications Policy Division
International Policy Division
International Economic Affairs Division
International Cooperation Division
Counselor
Information and Communications Bureau (情報流通行政局)
Director-General of the Information and Communications Bureau
General Affairs Division
Promotion for Content Distribution Division
ICT Accessibility and Human Resources Development Division
Advanced Information Systems and Software Division
Regional Communications Development Division
Broadcasting Policy Division
Broadcasting Technology Division
Terrestrial Broadcasting Division
Satellite and International Broadcasting Division
Regional Broadcasting Division
Postal Services Policy Planning Department
Director-General of the Postal Services Policy Planning Department
Planning Division
Postal Policy Division
Postal Savings and Postal Life Insurance Policy Division
Correspondence Delivery Business Division
Telecommunications Bureau (総合通信基盤局)
Director-General of the Telecommunications Bureau
General Affairs Division
Telecommunications Business Department
Director-General of the Telecommunications Business Department
Telecommunications Policy Division
Tariff and Telecommunications Access Policy Division
Computer Communications Division
Telecommunication Systems Division
Advanced Network Division
Telecommunications Consumer Policy Division
Radio Department
Director-General of the Radio Department
Radio Policy Division
Fixed Radio Communications Division
Land Mobile Communications Division
Mobile Satellite Communications Division
Electromagnetic Environment Division
Statistics Bureau (統計局)
Director-General of Statistics Bureau
General Affairs Division
Statistical Information Systems Division
Statistical Standards Department
Director-General of the Statistical Survey Department
Statistical Planning Division
International Statistical Affairs Division
Director for Statistical Clearance (3)
Statistical Survey Department
Director General of Department
Survey Planning Division
Population Census Division
Economic Statistics Division
Economic Structure Statistics Division
Consumer Statistics Division
Director General for Policy Planning
Director for Statistical Planning
Director for Statistical Clearance (3)
Director for International Statistical Affairs

Institutes and colleges

 Local Autonomy College (自治大学校)
 Institute for Information and Communications Policy (情報通信政策研究所)
 Statistical Research and Training Institute (統計研修所)
 Fire and Dispute Management College (消防大学校)

Special organizations

 Central Election Management Council (中央選挙管理会)
 National Committee for the Management of Political Funds (政治資金適正化委員会)
 Commissioner for Local Dispute Management (自治紛争処理委員) (Committee for Settling National-Local Disputes)
  (closed 2016)

External agencies

 Environmental Dispute Coordination Commission (公害等調整委員会)
 Fire and Disaster Management Agency (消防庁)

See also 
 Home Ministry (Japan)

References

External links 
 Ministry of Internal Affairs and Communications
 MIC Certification Services

Internal Affairs And Communications

Japan
Japan
Japan, Internal Affairs And Communications
2001 establishments in Japan